No Impact Man is a 2009 American documentary film directed by Laura Gabbert and Justin Schein, based on the book by Colin Beavan. The film, which premiered September 4, 2009, follows Colin Beavan and his family during their year-long experiment to have zero impact on the environment. The film mostly takes place in New York City.

See also
 Appropriate technology
 Carbon footprint
 Carbon neutrality
 Conservation (ethic)
 Individual and political action on climate change
 Non-carbon economy
 Sustainable living

References

External links

No Impact Project resources and blog
A blogger comparison between the film and book.

2009 films
2009 in the environment
American independent films
American documentary films
Documentary films about environmental issues
2009 documentary films
Films shot in New York City
2009 independent films
2000s English-language films
2000s American films